The Unguarded Hour is a 1925 American silent comedy-drama film directed by Lambert Hillyer and starring Milton Sills, Doris Kenyon, and Claude King. The film's sets were designed by the art director Milton Menasco.

Plot
As described in a review in a film magazine, Bryce Gilbert (King), business man, shows his daughter Virginia (Kenyon) the folly of an intended elopement with a youth. She goes to Italy and meets Duke Andrea d'Arona (Sills), a young and handsome man, who is puzzled by her jazzy American ways and doubts her character. Virginia is found with a certain male flirt in her room and misunderstood until it develops that the duke's sister (Cassinelli) has been misled by the male flirt and is listening in another room. The sister kills herself and the tragedy brings the duke and the young American woman to an understanding of their love.

Cast

Preservation
With no prints of The Unguarded Hour located in any film archives, it is a lost film.

References

Bibliography
 Munden, Kenneth White. The American Film Institute Catalog of Motion Pictures Produced in the United States, Part 1. University of California Press, 1997.

External links

1925 films
1925 comedy-drama films
Films directed by Lambert Hillyer
American silent feature films
American black-and-white films
First National Pictures films
Films with screenplays by Joseph F. Poland
1920s English-language films
1920s American films
Silent American comedy-drama films